Thomas Benson (1654 – 1715) was an Anglican priest in Ireland during the late 17th and early 18th centuries.

Benson was educated at Trinity College, Dublin. He was the Archdeacon of Kildare from 1681 until his death.;

References

1715 deaths
Alumni of Trinity College Dublin
17th-century Irish Anglican priests
18th-century Irish Anglican priests
1654 births
Archdeacons of Kildare
People from County Kildare